Laila Selbæk Rønning (born 24 November 1981) is a retired Norwegian cross-country skier. She competed at the 2000 and 2001 Junior World Championships, managing a 25th and a 26th place. She made her World Cup debut in the March 2002 Oslo sprint race. She collected her first World Cup points at the 2003 Holmenkollen ski festival, finishing 28th in the 30 km. Her last World Cup outing came at the 2006 Holmenkollen ski festival. She represented the sports clubs IL Nor (Meldal) and Strindheim IL. She is married to fellow cross-country skier Eldar Rønning.

Cross-country skiing results
All results are sourced from the International Ski Federation (FIS).

World Cup

Season standings

References 

1981 births
Living people
People from Meldal
Norwegian female cross-country skiers
Sportspeople from Trøndelag